Fat mass and obesity-associated protein also known as alpha-ketoglutarate-dependent dioxygenase FTO is an enzyme that in humans is encoded by the FTO gene located on chromosome 16. As one homolog in the AlkB family proteins, it is the first mRNA demethylase that has been identified.  Certain alleles of the FTO gene appear to be correlated with obesity in humans.

Function 
The amino acid sequence of the transcribed FTO protein shows high similarity with the enzyme AlkB which oxidatively demethylates DNA.  FTO is a member of the superfamily of alpha-ketoglutarate-dependent hydroxylase, which are non-heme iron-containing proteins. Recombinant FTO protein was first discovered to catalyze demethylation of 3-methylthymine in single-stranded DNA, and 3-methyluridine in single-stranded RNA, with low efficiency.  The nucleoside N6-methyladenosine (m6A), an abundant modification in RNA, was then found to be a major substrate of FTO. The FTO gene expression was also found to be significantly upregulated in the hypothalamus of rats after food deprivation and strongly negatively correlated with the expression of orexigenic galanin-like peptide which is involved in the stimulation of food intake.

Increases in hypothalamic expression of FTO are associated with the regulation of energy intake but not feeding reward.

People with two copies of the risk allele for the rs9939609 single nucleotide polymorphism (SNP) showed differing neural responses to food images via fMRI.  However, rs9939609's association with FTO is controversial, and may actually affect another gene, called Iroquois homeobox protein 3 (IRX3).

FTO demethylates RNA 

FTO has been demonstrated to efficiently demethylate the related modified ribonucleotide, N6,2'-O-dimethyladenosine, and to an equal or lesser extent, m6A, in vitro . FTO knockdown with siRNA led to increased amounts of m6A in polyA-RNA, whereas overexpression of FTO resulted in decreased amounts of m6A in human cells.  FTO partially co-localizes with nuclear speckles, which supports the notion that in the nucleus, m6A can be a substrate of FTO. Function of FTO could affect the processing of pre-mRNA, other nuclear RNAs, or both. The discovery of the FTO-mediated oxidative demethylation of RNA may initiate further investigations on biological regulation based on reversible chemical modification of RNA, and identification of RNA substrates for which FTO has the highest affinity.

FTO can oxidize m6A to generate N6 -hydroxymethyladenosine(hm6A) as an intermediate modification and N6 - formyladenosine(f6A) as a further oxidized product in mammalian cells.

Plants do not carry orthologs of FTO and artificial introduction of an FTO transgene causes substantial and widespread RNA demethylation. Instead of causing catastrophic disregulation, the treated rice and potato plants show significant (50%) increases in yield and become more tolerant to drought. In mESCs and during mouse development, FTO has been shown to mediated LINE1 RNA m6A demethylation and consequently affect local chromatin state and nearby gene transcription.

Tissue distribution 
The FTO gene is widely expressed in both fetal and adult tissues.

Clinical significance

Obesity 

38,759 Europeans were studied for variants of FTO obesity risk allele. In particular, carriers of one copy of the allele weighed on average  more than people with no copies. Carriers of two copies (16% of the subjects) weighed  more and had a 1.67-fold higher rate of obesity than those with no copies. The association was observed in ages 7 and upwards.  This gene is not directly associated with diabetes; however, increased body-fat also increases the risk of developing type 2 diabetes.

Simultaneously, a study of 2,900 affected individuals and 5,100 controls of French descent, together with 500 trios (confirming an association independent of population stratification) found association of SNPs in the very same region of FTO (rs1421085). The authors found that this variation, or a variation in strong LD with this variation explains 1% of the population BMI variance and 22% of the population attributable risk of obesity. The authors of this study claim that while obesity was already known to have a genetic component (from twin studies), no replicated previous study has ever identified an obesity risk allele that was so common in the human population. The risk allele is a cluster of 10 single nucleotide polymorphism in the first intron of FTO called rs9939609. According to HapMap, it has population frequencies of 45% in the West/Central Europeans, 52% in Yorubans (West African natives) and 14% in Chinese/Japanese. Furthermore, morbid obesity is associated with a combination of FTO and INSIG2 single nucleotide polymorphisms.

In 2009, variants in the FTO gene were further confirmed to associate with obesity in two very large genome wide association studies of body mass index (BMI).

In adult humans, it was shown that adults bearing the at risk AT and AA alleles at rs9939609 consumed between 500 and 1250 kJ more each day than those carrying the protective TT genotype (equivalent to between 125 and 280 kcal per day more intake).   The same study showed that there was no impact of the polymorphism on energy expenditure. This finding of an effect of the rs9939609 polymorphism on food intake or satiety has been independently replicated in five subsequent studies (in order of publication). Three of these subsequent studies also measured resting energy expenditure and confirmed the original finding that there is no impact of the polymorphic variation at the rs9939609 locus on energy expenditure.  A different study explored the effects of variation in two different SNPs in the FTO gene (rs17817449 and rs1421085) and suggested there might be an effect on circulating leptin levels and energy expenditure, but this latter effect disappeared when the expenditure was normalised for differences in body composition. The accumulated data across seven independent studies therefore clearly implicates the FTO gene in humans as having a direct impact on food intake but no effect on energy expenditure.

Human hypothalamic neurons derived from individuals carrying the obesity-risk variation at FTO SNPs rs1421085 or rs8050136 express lower levels of the adjacent gene RPGRIP1L compared to individuals carrying the protective variation. The transcription factor CUX1 binds DNA at rs1421085 or rs8050136 in the presence of the protective variation and promotes RPGRIP1L expression suggesting a potential molecular mechanism by which FTO obesity-associates SNPs alter the expression of nearby genes. Reduced expression of RPGRIP1L in mice results in increased body weight due to increased food intake, with no changes in energy expenditure, in agreement with data accumulated in human studies. RPGRIP1L is a protein found in primary cilia that are cellular organelles important for body weight regulation. Decreased RPGRIP1L expression in the mouse brain, or cells derived from humans, results in lower sensitivity for the hormone leptin that suppresses feeding, as well as alters the morphology of the hypothalamus that controls food consumption. These studies provide a potential mechanism by which obesity-risk variations in FTO SNPs promote increased food intake by influencing the function of genes in the vicinity.

The obesity-associated noncoding region within the FTO gene interacts directly with the promoter of IRX3, a homeobox gene, and IRX5, another homeobox gene. The noncoding region of FTO interacts with the promoters of IRX3 and FTO in human, mouse and zebrafish, and with IRX5. Results suggest that IRX3 and IRX5 are linked with obesity and determine body mass and composition. This is further supported by the fact that obesity-associated single nucleotide polymorphisms, in which cytosine is substituted for thymine,  are involved in the expression of IRX3 and IRX5 (not FTO) in human brains. The enhanced expression of IRX3 and IRX5 resulting from this single nucleotide alteration promoted a shift from energy-dissipating beige adipocytes to energy-storing white adipocytes and a subsequent reduction in mitochondrial thermogenesis by a factor of 5. Another study found indications that the FTO allele associated with obesity represses mitochondrial thermogenesis in adipocyte precursor cells in a tissue-autonomous manner, and that there is a pathway for adipocyte thermoregulation which involves the proteine ARID5B, the single-nucleotide variant rs1421085, and the IRX3 and IRX5 genes.

Alzheimer's disease 

Recent studies revealed that carriers of common FTO gene polymorphisms show both a reduction in frontal lobe volume of the brain and an impaired verbal fluency performance. Fittingly, a population-based study from Sweden found that carriers of the FTO rs9939609 A allele have an increased risk for incident Alzheimer disease.

Other diseases 

The presence of the FTO rs9939609 A allele was also found to be positively correlated with other symptoms of the metabolic syndrome, including  higher fasting insulin, glucose, and triglycerides, and lower HDL cholesterol. However all these effects appear to be secondary to weight increase since no association was found after correcting for increases in body mass index. Similarly, the association of rs11076008 G allele with the increased risk for degenerative disc disease was reported.

Model organisms 

Model organisms have been used in the study of FTO function. In contrast to the findings in humans deletion, analysis of the Fto gene in mice showed loss of function is associated with no differences in energy intake but greater energy expenditure and this results in a reduction of body weight and fatness. Furthermore recent studies demonstrated that FTO in the brain could regulate activity of the dopaminergic midbrain circuitry, memory processes in the hippocampus and anxiety-like behaviors. 

Another conditional knockout mouse line, called Ftotm1a(EUCOMM)Wtsi was generated as part of the International Knockout Mouse Consortium program — a high-throughput mutagenesis project to generate and distribute animal models of disease to interested scientists. Male and female animals from this line underwent a standardized phenotypic screen to determine the effects of deletion. Twenty five tests were carried out on mutant mice and only significant skeletal abnormalities were observed, including kyphosis and abnormal vertebral transverse processes, and only in female homozygous mutant animals.

The reasons for the differences in FTO phenotype between humans and different lines of mice is presently uncertain. However, many other genes involved in regulation of energy balance exert effects on both intake and expenditure.

Origin of name 

By exon trapping, Peters et al. (1999) cloned a novel gene from a region of several hundred kb deleted by the mouse 'fused toes' (FT) mutation. They named the gene 'fatso' (Fto) due to its large size.

References

External links 
 
 
 

Genes on human chromosome 16
Human 2OG oxygenases
EC 1.14.11
Genes mutated in mice